The Indian Telly Awards is an annual award for excellence both on-screen and behind-the-scenes of Hindi-language television. Conceptualised and created by Anil Wanvari, the founder, CEO of media and services group, indiantelevision.com, they are in their 12th edition currently. Wanvari is also on the board of the International Academy of Television Arts and Sciences (which runs the International Emmy Awards), and has been a semi-final judging host for the awards since 2006.
The awards for Indian television are given in several categories such as best programme or series in a specific genre, most popular actors and awards for technical roles such as writers and directors. The awards are currently managed by a division within indiantelevision.com called ITV2.0 Productions.

History
For the first three years, The Indian Telly Awards were aired on Indian Hindi general entertainment channel Star Plus (2001–2003).
From 2004 to 2009, Sony Entertainment Television was the home of The Indian Telly Awards with the channel commissioning Indiantelevision.com to produce it and acquiring the content to air on its channel Sony. Since its 10th edition, the awards ceremony moved to Viacom 18 Hindi general entertainment channel Colors TV. &TV took over the broadcasting rights, starting the fourteenth edition.

The Indian Telly Awards were first presented on 6 July 2001.

TV and film actor Alyy Khan hosted the first awards, held at the Oberoi Trident hotel in Mumbai. Actors Bhakti Barve and Jatin Kanakia received posthumous awards. In 2001 and 2003, the awards were hosted by television Actor Ram Kapoor & his wife Gautami Kapoor

Television actors Ram Kapoor and Roshni Chopra hosted the 2007 awards. In 2008 the awards were anchored by Cyrus Broacha and Mini Mathur.  The 2009 awards were hosted by Vishal Malhotra and Mona Singh. In 2010,the Awards were hosted by Ronit Roy and Meghna Malik. The 11th Indian Telly Awards, held in the year 2012, were hosted by Ronit Roy & Ram Kapoor and co-hosted by Manish Paul & Roshni Chopra. In the year 2013, 12th Indian Telly Awards were once again hosted by Ronit Roy and Ram Kapoor and co-hosted by Rashmi Desai, Kavita Kaushik.

Categories
Awards are presented in the following categories:

Technical awards (tc)
 These awards are given for specific skills which help enhance – or set new standards of technical quality of a TV programme, be it in the area of cinematography, editing, costume or what have you. An individual or team from a production house/post production house which has excelled in this specific aspect during the specific period can be nominated.

 TC 1 -Special/Visual Effects for Television
 TC 2 – Art Direction (Fiction)
 TC 3 – Art Direction (Non-Fiction)
 TC 4 – Videography (Best TV Cameraman – Fiction)
 TC 5 – Videography (Best TV Cameraman – Non – Fiction)
 TC 6 – Costumes for a TV Programme
 TC 7 – Make Up Artist
 TC 8 – Stylist
 TC 9 – TV Show Packaging (Fiction)
 TC 10 – TV Show Packaging (Non-Fiction) On an Entertainment Channel
 TC 11 – TV Channel Packaging (Including Channel Ids & Generic Promos)
 TC 12 – Editor (Fiction)
 TC 13 – Editor (Non-Fiction)
 TC 14 – Background Music for a TV Programme (Fiction)
 TC 15 – TV Lyricist
 TC 16 – Music Director
 TC 17 – Title Singer for a TV Show
 TC 18 – Director (Soap & Drama)
 TC 19 – Director (Sitcom)
 TC 20 – Director (Thriller)
 TC 21 – Director (Non- Fiction)
 TC 22 – Screenplay Writer (Drama Series & Soap)
 TC 23 – Dialogue Writer (Drama Series & Soap)
 TC 24 – Sitcom/Comedy Writer
 TC 25 – Story Writer
 TC 26 – Scriptwriter (Non Fiction)
 TC 27 – Choreographer

Trade awards (tr)
 These awards recognize excellent performances by MSO's and TV production houses during the specific period. A detailed note should specify the achievements of the nominee during the year.
 TR 1 – Cable Operator / MSO (Multi Systems Operator)
 TR 2 – TV Production House

Programming awards (pr)
 Programming awards will be presented to television software producers and channel executives for programmes of various genres.

 PR 1 -Edutainment / Science / Knowledge Based Show
 PR 2 -Entertainment News Show on an Entertainment Channel
 PR 3 -Public Service Programme
 PR 4 -Lifestyle & Fashion Show
 PR 5 -Talk Show on an Entertainment Channel
 PR 6 -Cookery show
 PR 7 -Sports Show
 PR 8 -Travel Show
 PR 9 -Health & Fitness Show

Jury awards (jr)
 Jury awards are presented to television Actors and artiste of various shows.

 JR 1 – Actor in a Comic Role
 JR 2 – Actress in a Comic Role
 JR 3 – Actress in a Supporting Role
 JR 4 – Actor in a Supporting Role
 JR 5 – Actress in a Negative Role
 JR 6 – Actor in a Negative Role
 JR 7 – Actress in a Lead Role
 JR 8 – Actor in a Lead Role
 JR 9 – Drama Series

Popular awards

 PO 1 – Indian Telly Award for Best Child Artiste - Female
 PO 2 – Indian Telly Award for Best Child Artiste - Male
 PO 3 – Indian Telly Award for Best Anchor
 PO 4 – Indian Telly Award for Best Actress in a Comic Role
 PO 5 – Indian Telly Award for Best Actor in a Comic Role
 PO 6 – Indian Telly Award for Best Actress in a Supporting Role
 PO 7 – Indian Telly Award for Best Actor in a Supporting Role
 PO 8 – Indian Telly Award for Best Television Personality of the Year
 PO 9 – Indian Telly Award for Best Actress in a Negative Role
 PO 10 – Indian Telly Award for Best Actor in a Negative Role
 PO 11 – Indian Telly Award for Fresh New Face - Female
 PO 12 – Indian Telly Award for Fresh New Face - Male
 PO 13 – Indian Telly Award for Best Actress in a Lead Role
 PO 14 – Indian Telly Award for Best Actor in a Lead Role
 PO 15 – Indian Telly Award for Best Ensemble Cast
 PO 16 – Programme with a Social Message
 PO 17 – Daily Serial
 PO 18 – Weekly Serial
 PO 19 – Continuing TV Programme
 PO 20 – Drama Series
 PO 21 – Thriller/ Horror Programme
 PO 22 – Kid's Programme
 PO 23 – Sitcom/Comedy Programme
 PO 24 – Best Reality Show
 PO 25 – Best Game Show
 PO 26 – Dance Talent Show
 PO 27 – Singing Talent Show
 PO 28 – Comedy Talent Show
 PO 29 – Historical/ Mythological Series
 PO 30 – Judge Panel on a TV Show
 PO 31 – Youth Show – Fiction
 PO 32 – Youth Show – Non Fiction
 PO 33 – Televised Awards Show
 PO 34 – Televised Entertainment Show
 PO 35 – Indian Telly Award for Best Onscreen Couple
 PO 36 – Indian Telly Awards for Best Actor in a Supporting Role - Comedy
 PO 37 – Indian Telly Awards for Best Actress in a Supporting Role - Comedy

See also

 List of Asian television awards
 11th Indian Telly Awards

References

External links
 Indian Telly Awards Official website
 IndianTelevision.com website
 

 
Indian Telly Awards